Pseudomelieria is a genus of picture-winged flies in the family Ulidiidae.

Species
 P. argentina

References

Ulidiidae